Cheree Cassidy is an Australian actress. For her performance in the Underbelly: The Golden Mile she was nominated for the 2010 AFI Award For Best Lead Actress In A Television Drama.

Other screen performances include Paper Giants: The Birth of Cleo.

Stage performances include When Dad Married Fury at the Ensemble Theatre in 2012, The Boys at the Griffin Theatre and touring with the Black Swan's adaptation of Cat on a Hot Tin Roof.

References

External links
 

 
Living people
Australian film actresses
Australian television actresses
Australian stage actresses